The Sammy Miller Motorcycle Museum is an independent museum in New Milton, Hampshire, England. It was set up in 1964, after the former championship winning observed trials rider Sammy Miller set up a parts business in New Milton.

The business started after Miller put a few of his old racing motorcycles in the corner, which eventually became the catalyst of the present day museum.
The museum is now held in trust, houses some 300 machines including motorcycles and 3-wheeled vehicles and is affiliated to the British Motorcycle Charitable Trust.

The collection includes Vincent/H.R.D., BSA, Zundapp, Norton and Moto Guzzi motorcycles.

In 2020 a two-storey  extension was added and the Museum's collection reorganised.

See also
 Outline of motorcycles and motorcycling

References

External links
 Sammy Miller Motorcycle Museum website

Museums established in 1964
Museums in Hampshire
Transport in Hampshire
Transport museums in England
Motorcycle museums in the United Kingdom